WGEV was a college radio station that was owned by Geneva College in Beaver Falls, Pennsylvania.  The station began broadcasting on November 15, 1965 at 12:30 pm.  The station used to broadcast on 88.3 FM, but its license was canceled in September 2007. A class D station, WGEV applied for a power upgrade and move to class A status in 1989 but that move was rejected in July 1989 as it would have caused significant interference with the broadcast signal of WYSU in Youngstown, Ohio.

Awards and honors
In 1995, WGEV was a finalist in the "creative production" category of the Marconi College Radio Awards. The station was honored for the program "Gospel Galaxy", a science fiction tale about the crew of a Christian starship whose mission is to spread the Gospel through music.

WGEV today
WGEV moved operations to internet radio, but ceased operations in December 2013.

References

GEV
GEV
Defunct radio stations in the United States
Internet radio stations in the United States
Radio stations established in 1989
1989 establishments in Pennsylvania
Geneva College
2007 disestablishments in Pennsylvania
Radio stations disestablished in 2007
GEV